Vivo is the fourth album released by Mexican rock band, Coda. It was released in 2006 after the band regrouped with an almost new line-up.

Track listing
 "Delirando" 
 "Firme"
 "Simplemente Te Amo"
 "Mitades"
 "Terror Virtual"
 "Te Extraño"
 "Tras El Viento"
 "Invisible"
 "Zona"
 "Vacío Infinito"
 "Cambia El Canal"
 "Tren Vagabundo"
 "S. O. S."
 "Dame Tu Corazón"
 "Vampiro"
 "No Te Das Cuenta"
 "Chasing The Wind"
 "Stand Firm"
 "I Miss You"
 "Aun" (Live)

Personnel
 Salvador Aguilar – lead vocals
 Enrique Cuevas – guitars
 Iram Sanchez – drums
 Jordan Pisano – bass
 Leo Castellanos – keyboards

Notes

References
Album Info at Heavy Harmonies.

2006 albums
Coda (band) albums